Jen Tullock is an American actress.

Early life 
Tullock was raised in the Louisville, Kentucky, area. She was raised in the evangelical church, where she first performed. She studied acting at Millikin University and graduated with a BFA in Acting.

Career 
Tullock moved to Brooklyn in 2007 where she worked as a theatre actor and writer. She also practiced improv, performed one-woman shows, did voice-over work, and commercials. Tullock relocated to Hollywood in 2015 and had roles on Curb Your Enthusiasm, Casual, and SMILF.

Tullock co-wrote and starred in her film Before You Know It, co-starring Judith Light, Mandy Patinkin, and Alec Baldwin. Tullock plays the role of Devon in the television series Severance.

Television

Film

References 

21st-century American actresses
Actresses from Louisville, Kentucky
American film actresses
American filmmakers
American queer actresses
American television actresses
LGBT people from Kentucky
Living people
Writers from Louisville, Kentucky
Year of birth missing (living people)